Washington Park High School (also known as Park or Racine Park High School) is a public, four-year high school in Racine, Wisconsin, USA, with an enrollment of over 2,400 students. Its school colors are blue and orange. The school's mascot, the panther, was adopted by the Class of 1949, reportedly because of a nearby Native American effigy mound in the shape of a panther. It is a part of the Racine Unified School District.

History

The school traces its roots to 1852 when Racine High School, one of the first public schools in Wisconsin, opened. In 1926, the Racine School Board decided to replace Racine High School with a new school that eventually became Park. The new Washington Park High School opened in 1928. The north side of Racine also received its own high school the same year when land donated by the malted milk magnate William Horlick was used by the Racine School board for another high school named in Horlick's honor.

The school building was designed by the Racine architect J. Mandor Matson. The school mascot is the panther.

Much of the history and memorabilia (including art, awards and traditions) from Racine High School were moved to Park. The statue of Joan of Arc that was donated by the Racine High School Class of 1904 is displayed in Park's foyer. The school's newspaper, The Beacon (a reference to Racine's Wind Point Lighthouse), and the school yearbook Kipikawi (a Native American name for the Root River), were also both carried over from Racine High School.

Athletics
Park's sports teams compete in the Wisconsin Interscholastic Athletic Association (WIAA) Southeast Conference with schools from Racine, Kenosha and southern Milwaukee, including Park's long-time crosstown rivals Horlick High School and Case High School, the other major high schools in Racine.

Rivalry with William Horlick
Park has a long-standing rivalry with William Horlick athletic teams, known locally as "The Great Rivalry" or more informally as "Park/Horlick". The rivalry began in 1928, when the two schools opened. The rivalry is most notable between the schools' football teams who have played at least once every year since 1928.

State championships

School song
Hail to thee, Park High.
Hail thy orange and blue.
Thy light shall guide us,
Thy beacon bright and true.
We'll serve thee always.
This our pledge shall be:
Park High, forever,
Hail, hail, hail to thee

Notable alumni
Kevin Barry – NFL offensive lineman with the Green Bay Packers and Houston Texans
Annastasia Batikis – AAGPBL outfielder with the Racine Belles
Caron Butler – NBA professional basketball player
John Clay – NFL running back for the Pittsburgh Steelers.
Scott C. Fergus – member of the Wisconsin State Assembly
Kenneth L. Greenquist – member of the Wisconsin State Senate
Ben Hecht – screenwriter, director, producer, playwright, journalist, and novelist
Solomon Hutcherson – MMA and UFC fighter.
Abdul Jeelani (né Gary Cole) – NBA small forward with the Dallas Mavericks and Portland Trail Blazers
Maj. John L. Jerstad (1918–1943) – World War II Major, U.S. Army Air Force Pilot and Medal of Honor recipient
Maj. Gen. Richard G. Kaiser ('83) - Major General, U.S. Army (retired)
Fredric March (1897–1975) – two-time Academy Award and Tony Award-winning stage and film actor
Barbara McNair – singer and actress
Eric Morones, saxophonist and composer, lead alto saxophonist for Brian Setzer Orchestra
Brent Moss – NFL running back with the Miami Dolphins and St. Louis Rams
Norm Nelson - American stock car racer
Edward Peil Sr., actor
LaTonya Sims – professional basketball player and UW-Madison basketball player, Gatorade Player of the Year
William H. Upham (1841–1924) – 18th Governor of Wisconsin
Fred Venturelli – NFL kicker with the Chicago Bears
Jerry Woods – NFL defensive back with the Detroit Lions and Green Bay Packers
Al Zupek – NFL fullback

See also
The World's Best Prom: An award-winning documentary and forthcoming feature-length documentary about high school prom in Racine, Wisconsin.

References

External links
Official Park High web site
Park High School athletics web site
Racine history: Racine High School
"Park High School Turns 75", Milwaukee Journal Sentinel, May 8, 2004.

High schools in Racine, Wisconsin
Educational institutions established in 1928
Public high schools in Wisconsin
1928 establishments in Wisconsin